Eipic is the Irish word for "epic".

It may refer to:
Eipic (restaurant), located in Belfast
Eipic (TV series), aired in 2016

See also
Epic (disambiguation)